Bhumi Pednekar (born 18 July 1989) is an Indian actress who appears in Hindi films. After working as an assistant casting director at Yash Raj Films for six years, she made her film debut as an overweight bride in the company's romantic comedy Dum Laga Ke Haisha (2015), which earned her the Filmfare Award for Best Female Debut.

Pednekar rose to prominence by playing headstrong small-town women in the comedy-dramas Toilet: Ek Prem Katha (2017), Shubh Mangal Saavdhan (2017), Bala (2019) and Pati Patni Aur Woh (2019). For her portrayal of the septuagenarian sharpshooter Chandro Tomar in Saand Ki Aankh (2019), she won the Filmfare Critics Award for Best Actress. She has since gained praise for playing women exploring their sexuality in Dolly Kitty Aur Woh Chamakte Sitare (2020) and Badhaai Do (2022).

Early life 
Pednekar was born in Bombay (now Mumbai) on 18 July 1989. She is of Konkani and Haryanvi descent; her father, Satish, was a former home and labour minister of Maharashtra, and her mother, Sumitra, worked as an anti-tobacco activist after the death of her husband from oral cancer. She did her schooling from Arya Vidya Mandir in Juhu. At the age of 15, her parents took out a study loan for her to study acting at Whistling Woods International, but she was expelled due to poor attendance. Within a year and a half, she joined Yash Raj Films as an assistant film director, and paid off the loan. She went on to work with the company for six years under Shanoo Sharma.

Career

Early work and recognition (2015–2018) 

Pednekar's acting debut came as the overweight wife of Ayushmann Khurrana's character in the Yash Raj Films-produced and Sharat Katariya-directed romantic comedy Dum Laga Ke Haisha (2015) In preparation, she gained almost 12 kg body weight. Rajeev Masand reviewed, "Pednekar steals the film with an assured turn, effortlessly making you care for Sandhya, without ever reducing her to a slobbering, self-pitying caricature." After filming, she began losing weight and shared methods and tips of the process through her social media. A commercial success, Dum Laga Ke Haisha won the National Film Award for Best Feature Film in Hindi and earned Pednekar the Filmfare Award for Best Female Debut. That year she was featured in Y-Films's four part mini web series Man's World. Based on the subject of gender inequality, it digitally premiered on YouTube.

Two years later, Pednekar was cast in the satire Toilet: Ek Prem Katha (2017) as a young woman in rural India who insists on the eradication of open defecation, opposite Akshay Kumar. Despite disliking the story, Saibal Chatterjee of NDTV praised her for "flesh[ing] out a refreshingly relatable college topper who becomes the principal catalyst for a mini-revolution".

Later that year, her performance opposite Khurrana in Shubh Mangal Saavdhan, a satire on erectile dysfunction, earned Pednekar her first nomination for the Filmfare Award for Best Actress. Reviewing the film for The Indian Express, Shubhra Gupta wrote that Pednekar "once again reminds us just how convincing she can be as a real honest-to-goodness young woman in search of love", but bemoaned that she was being typecast in such roles. Shubh Mangal Saavdhan grossed  worldwide. Zoya Akhtar's segment in the Netflix anthology film Lust Stories marked Pednekar's sole screen appearance of 2018; she played a maid who has an affair with her employer. Writing for NDTV, Raja Sen considered Akhtar's segment to be the best in the anthology, and found Pednekar "hauntingly good" in it.

Rise to prominence (2019–present) 

Abhishek Chaubey's crime drama Sonchiriya was Pednekar's first release of 2019. She played a young housewife on the run in rural Chambal, alongside Sushant Singh Rajput and Manoj Bajpayee. In preparation, she underwent two and a half months of physical training to portray her character's mannerism and gait; she also learned to fire a gun. Rahul Desai of Film Companion praised the subtlety in the film and its performances, and credited Pednekar for "lend[ing] an inevitable sense of womanhood to the silenced". She next starred as the septuagenarian sharpshooter Chandro Tomar in Tushar Hiranandani's biographical film Saand Ki Aankh, opposite Taapsee Pannu who played her sister-in-law Prakashi Tomar. In preparation, Pannu and Pednekar spent time with the two women and trained in shooting a gun. She suffered from skin allergies from filming in the heat wearing prosthetic make-up. Udita Jhunjunwala of Mint wrote, "Pannu and Pednekar are wonderful and spunky and embrace their parts even though their body language and posture is variable". Both actresses were jointly awarded the Screen Award and Filmfare Critics Award for Best Actress.

Continuing her portrayals of headstrong small-town women, Pednekar starred in Bala and Pati Patni Aur Woh (both 2019). The former marked her third collaboration with Khurrana, in which she played a dark-skinned woman who faces prejudice due to her skin colour. Controversy arose for casting a fair-skinned woman in the role, but Pednekar defended herself by saying that an actor should be allowed to play any part. Pati Patni Aur Woh, a remake of a 1978 film of the same name and co-starring Kartik Aaryan and Ananya Panday, featured her as a housewife with a philandering husband. Anupama Chopra wrote that "it's Bhumi Pednekar's spirited Vedika who lifts the material up a notch. Bhumi has an intelligence that rescues some of the silliest scenes in this film, especially in the climax." Both Bala and Pati Patni Aur Woh were commercially successful, each grossing over  worldwide.

Dolly Kitty Aur Woh Chamakte Sitare, directed by Alankrita Shrivastava and co-starring Konkona Sen Sharma, was screened at the 24th Busan International Film Festival in 2019 and released on Netflix later in 2020. Nandini Ramnath of Scroll.in wrote that despite doing a "fine job", Pednekar had been overshadowed by her co-star Sen Sharma. Nonetheless, both actresses received nominations for the Filmfare Critics Award for Best Actress. She next had brief roles in the comedy-drama Shubh Mangal Zyada Saavdhan and the horror film Bhoot – Part One: The Haunted Ship. In the same year, Pednekar starred in a remake of the horror film Bhaagamathie, named Durgamati, which was released on Amazon Prime Video. In a scathing review, Rohan Naahar of Hindustan Times disliked the film and Pednekar's performance.

After a year-long absence from the screen, Pednekar starred alongside Rajkummar Rao as gay individuals in a lavender marriage in the comedy-drama Badhaai Do (2022). Rachana Dubey of The Times of India praised the film's handling of LGBT themes and found Pednekar's performance to be "sensitive, nuanced, and on point". She reteamed with Akshay Kumar in Aanand L. Rai's family film Raksha Bandhan. The film was panned for its regressive storytelling and it emerged as a box office bomb. She then appeared in Shashank Khaitan's comic thriller Govinda Naam Mera, co-starring Vicky Kaushal and Kiara Advani, which released on Disney+ Hotstar.

Upcoming projects
Pednekar will reteam with  Rajkummar Rao in Anubhav Sinha's thriller Bheed, and play a police officer in the thriller Bhakshak. Pednekar will star with Arjun Kapoor in two projects: the thriller The Lady Killer and the comedy Meri Patni Ka Remake. In addition, she will appear alongside Nawazuddin Siddiqui in Sudhir Mishra's Afwaah.

Public image 

The journalist Priyanka Roy of The Telegraph wrote in 2019 that Pednekar specialises in playing "women of fortitude with a strong moral fibre, mostly hailing from small towns". She was featured by Forbes India in their 30 Under 30 list of 2018.

In 2019, Pednekar began a campaign named Climate Warrior to raise awareness on environmental protection and global warming. She is also vocal about issues such as pay parity and has spoken out about the gender pay gap in Bollywood, calling it "insulting" and "heartbreaking". In 2020, she teamed with MTV India for their Nishedh campaign, which aims to create awareness about health issues, including reproductive health, among the youth. She was appointed as the brand ambassador of Nykaa in 2022. 

Pednekar was ranked in The Times of Indias listing of the Most Desirable Women at number 40 in 2019, and at number 39 in 2020.

Filmography

Awards and nominations

Note

References

External links 
 
 
 
 

1989 births
Living people
Actresses from Mumbai
Actresses in Hindi cinema
21st-century Indian actresses
Indian film actresses
Filmfare Awards winners
Screen Awards winners
Zee Cine Awards winners
International Indian Film Academy Awards winners
Marathi actors
People of Haryanvi descent